Jonathan Mead (born April 10, 1967 in Regina, Saskatchewan) is a Canadian curler from Winnipeg, Manitoba. Mead played third for Wayne Middaugh's rink (except for provincial playdowns) until the end of the 2009–10 curling season. Beginning in the 2010–11 curling season, he again played third for Jeff Stoughton's Manitoba team.

Career
Before joining Middaugh, Mead was the longtime third for Jeff Stoughton, whose team he joined prior to the 1999 season. That year, they won the Manitoba provincial championships, the Brier and a silver medal at the World Curling Championships. They would return to the 2000 Brier, and again to the 2006 Brier but would not win again.

Mead also won the 1986 Canadian Junior Curling Championships as a third for Hugh McFadyen and won silver at the 1987 World Junior Curling Championships.

In March 2007, it was announced that Mead would join Wayne Middaugh's team for the following season on the World Curling Tour. This was mainly done for a run at the 2010 Winter Olympics, as Mead would be unable to play for the team in the Brier, as he is not a resident of Ontario.

In April 2010, it was reported that Mead would once again play with Jeff Stoughton's rink. He will continue playing at third, while Reid Carruthers, also joining the Stoughton team, will play as second. The reuniting was a success, as the team would go on to win the 2011 Tim Hortons Brier and the 2011 Ford World Men's Curling Championship.

Personal life
Mead works as a Business Development Consultant. He is married and has two children.

Mead served as an analyst for Shaw TV's coverage of the 2009 and 2010 Safeway Championships.

Teams

References

External links
 

Curling broadcasters
1967 births
Living people
Brier champions
Curlers from Regina, Saskatchewan
Curlers from Winnipeg
World curling champions
Canadian male curlers
Canada Cup (curling) participants